Thimmakudi is a village in the Kumbakonam taluk of Thanjavur district, Tamil Nadu, India.

Demographics 

As per the 2011 census, Thimmakudi had a total population of 994. The literacy rate was 70.93%.

References 

Villages in Thanjavur district